Georgia participated in the 2010 Summer Youth Olympics in Singapore.

Medalists

Judo

Individual

Team

Swimming

Wrestling

Freestyle

References

External links
Competitors List: Georgia

Nations at the 2010 Summer Youth Olympics
2010 in Georgian sport
Georgia (country) at the Youth Olympics